Geraldo de Oliveira (born 23 November 1919) was a Brazilian athlete. He competed at the 1948 Summer Olympics and the 1952 Summer Olympics.

References

External links
  

1919 births
Possibly living people
Athletes (track and field) at the 1948 Summer Olympics
Athletes (track and field) at the 1952 Summer Olympics
Brazilian male long jumpers
Olympic athletes of Brazil
Place of birth missing